Stenodacma is a genus of moths in the family Pterophoridae.

Species
Stenodacma cognata Gielis, 2009
Stenodacma pyrrhodes (Meyrick, 1889)
Stenodacma richardi Ustjuzhanin et Kovtunovich, 2010
Stenodacma wahlbergi (Zeller, 1851)
Stenodacma iranella Hans Georg Amsel, 1959

References

Oxyptilini
Moth genera
Taxa named by Hans Georg Amsel